Edaat (meaning "Spotlights"), hosted by Turki Al-Dakhil, airs every Thursday at 2:00 PM (Saudi Arabia time) and lasts one hour. The show consists of one-on-one interviews with influential regional figures, such as journalists, writers, activists, politicians, etc. (the programme is currently off air)

References

Al Arabiya
Television talk shows